Azurite is an inorganic pigment derived from the mineral of the same name. It was likely used by artists as early as the Fourth Dynasty in Egypt, but it was less frequently employed than synthetically produced copper pigments such as Egyptian Blue. In the Middle Ages and Renaissance, it was the most prevalent blue pigment in European paintings, appearing more commonly than the more expensive ultramarine. Azurite's derivation from copper mines tends to give it a greenish hue, in contrast with the more violet tone of ultramarine. Azurite is also less stable than ultramarine, and notable paintings such as Michelangelo's The Entombment have seen their azure blues turn to olive green in time. Azurite pigment typically includes traces of malachite and cuprite; both minerals are found alongside azurite in nature, and they may account for some of the green discoloration of the pigment. The particle size of azurite pigment has been shown to have a significant effect on its chromatic intensity, and the manner of grinding and preparing the pigment therefore has a major impact on its appearance.

References 

Inorganic pigments
Pigments
Shades of blue